Steven-Andreas Benda (born 1 October 1998) is a German professional footballer who plays as a goalkeeper for EFL Championship club Swansea City.

Career
Born in Stuttgart, Benda spent his early career with 1. FC Heidenheim and TSV 1860 Munich. He signed for Swansea City in August 2017 and signed a new three-year contract in June 2019. He joined the Swansea first-team in the 2018–19 season following an injury to Erwin Mulder.

He moved on loan to Swindon Town in September 2019. He made his senior debut on 8 October 2019, in the EFL Trophy, and made his Football League debut on 12 October 2019.

He moved on loan to Peterborough United in January 2022.

After his return to Swansea, appearing in 21 games as the club's number one goalkeeper for the 2022–23 season, Benda suffered a "significant" knee injury in January 2023.

Career statistics

Honours
Swindon Town
EFL League Two: 2019–20

References

1998 births
Living people
Association football goalkeepers
German footballers
1. FC Heidenheim players
TSV 1860 Munich players
Swansea City A.F.C. players
Swindon Town F.C. players
Peterborough United F.C. players
English Football League players
German expatriate footballers
German expatriate sportspeople in Wales
Expatriate footballers in Wales
German expatriate sportspeople in England
Expatriate footballers in England
Footballers from Stuttgart